One Wild Week is a lost 1921 American silent comedy romance film directed by Maurice Campbell and starring Bebe Daniels. Adolph Zukor produced the film through his Realart Pictures Corporation.

Plot
As described in a film magazine, Pauline Hathaway (Daniels) attains her eighteenth birthday was the ward of a spinster aunt and learns that she is heir to a small fortune provided she keeps her name out of the newspapers for a period of six months. She goes to visit an old friend of her mother and is falsely arrested for theft. After giving a fictitious name, she is sent to the woman's reformatory. She escapes with three other inmates and makes her way to the home of her hostess followed by her aunt and others who have become involved in the search for her. The film ends with satisfactory explanations being made.

Cast
Bebe Daniels as Pauline Hathaway
Frank Kingsley as Bruce Reynolds
Mayme Kelso as Emma Jessop
Frances Raymond as Mrs. Brewster
Herbert Standing as Judge Bancroft
Edwin Stevens as Oliver Tobin
Edythe Chapman as Mrs. Dorn
Carrie Clark Ward as Cook
Bull Montana as Red Mike

References

External links

American silent feature films
Lost American films
1921 romantic comedy films
American romantic comedy films
American black-and-white films
Films directed by Maurice Campbell
1921 lost films
Lost romantic comedy films
1920s American films
Silent romantic comedy films
Silent American comedy films
1920s English-language films